The Communauté de communes Artois-Lys was located in the Pas-de-Calais département, in northern France. It was created in January 1993. It was merged into the Communauté d'agglomération de Béthune-Bruay, Artois-Lys Romane in January 2017.

Composition
It comprised the following 21 communes:

Allouagne 
Ames 
Amettes 
Auchy-au-Bois 
Bourecq 
Burbure 
Busnes
Calonne-sur-la-Lys 
Ecquedecques 
Ferfay
Gonnehem
Ham-en-Artois
Lespesses 
Lières 
Lillers 
Mont-Bernanchon 
Norrent-Fontes 
Robecq 
Saint-Floris 
Saint-Venant
Westrehem

References 

Artois-Lys